Riera i Aragó was born in Barcelona, Spain in 1954. He studied at the Sant Jordi Fine Arts School, graduating in 1973. Throughout his career he has made sculptures, paintings, and graphical work. His work often depicts machines using recycled bronze and iron. He has had important solo and group exhibitions and is present in several museum collections. In addition, he has made large sculptures for public spaces.

Museums 
Musée de Ceret, France- Fundació Joan Miró, Barcelona - Musée d'Art Moderne, Luxembourg – Col•lecció Testimoni - Fundació La Caixa, Barcelona - Fondation Vincent van Gogh, Arles (France) - Städtische Museen, Heilbronn (Germany) - Musée Réattu, Arles (France) - Museum Otani, Nishinomiya (Japan) - Fundació La Caixa of Girona - Collection Cai Luzan, Zaragoza - Col.lecció Institut D'Estudis Catalans, Barcelona - MACBA, Barcelona - Museu d’Història de la Ciutat, Girona - Museu de l'Hospitalet - Collección Rega, Zurich, Switzerland - Fundación Fran Daurel, Barcelona - Musée d'Art moderne André Malraux, Le Havre

Publications 

                                                                                                                             
Riera i Aragó, Ediciones Polígrafa, 1991, Text by Gloria Picazo

Riera i Aragó, Editions Cercle d’Art, 1992, Text by Gloria Picazo

Riera i Aragó Iconografia, Ediciones Polígrafa 2003, Text by Valentin Roma

References

External links 
 www.rieraiarago.com

Spanish contemporary artists
Artists from Catalonia
Living people
1954 births
People from Barcelona